Marinette County is a county in the U.S. state of Wisconsin. As of the 2020 census, the population was 41,872. Its county seat is Marinette.  Marinette County is part of the Marinette, WI–MI Micropolitan Statistical Area.

Geography
It is the third-largest county in Wisconsin by land area and fifth-largest by total area. Part of Marinette County borders Lake Michigan, and this area is home to  endemic plants.

Adjacent counties
 Dickinson County, Michigan - north
 Menominee County, Michigan - northeast
 Door County - east and southeast, border is in Green Bay
 Oconto County - southwest
 Forest County - west
 Florence County - northwest

Major highways
  U.S. 8
  U.S. 41
  U.S. 141
  Highway 64
  Highway 180

Railroads
Canadian National
Escanaba and Lake Superior Railroad
Watco

Buses
List of intercity bus stops in Wisconsin

Airport
Crivitz Municipal Airport  serves Marinette County and surrounding communities.

Demographics

2020 census
As of the census of 2020, the population was 41,872. The racial makeup of the county was 93.4% White, 0.6% Native American, 0.5% Black or African American, 0.4% Asian, 1.1% from other races, and 4.0% from two or more races. Ethnically, the population was 2.6% Hispanic or Latino of any race.

2000 census

As of the census of 2000, there were 43,384 people, 17,585 households, and 11,834 families residing in the county. There were 26,260 housing units at an average density of 19 per square mile (7/km2). The racial makeup of the county was 98.08% White, 0.23% Black or African American, 0.50% Native American, 0.27% Asian, 0.02% Pacific Islander, 0.21% from other races, and 0.69% from two or more races. 0.75% of the population were Hispanic or Latino of any race. 37.8% were of German, 11.7% Polish, 6.4% French and 5.6% American ancestry.

There were 17,585 households, out of which 28.80% had children under the age of 18 living with them, 56.40% were married couples living together, 7.40% had a female householder with no husband present, and 32.70% were non-families. 28.30% of all households were made up of individuals, and 13.30% had someone living alone who was 65 years of age or older. The average household size was 2.38 and the average family size was 2.92.

In the county, the population was spread out, with 23.50% under the age of 18, 8.10% from 18 to 24, 25.90% from 25 to 44, 25.00% from 45 to 64, and 17.60% who were 65 years of age or older. The median age was 40 years. For every 100 females, there were 97.50 males. For every 100 females age 18 and over, there were 95.00 males.

In 2017, there were 383 births, giving a general fertility rate of 61.2 births per 1000 women aged 15–44, the 30th lowest rate out of all 72 Wisconsin counties. Additionally, there were 16 reported induced abortions performed on women of Marinette County residence in 2017.

Tourism
Tourism is important to many of the communities in Marinette County.  The county's two main rivers, the Peshtigo and Menominee, and many lakes, streams, and forests make the area an outdoor destination.

Snowmobiling is popular in the winter, and there is a large network of trails to accommodate the sport.

Dave's Falls are located in Marinette County, near Amberg.

Communities

Cities
 Marinette (county seat)
 Niagara
 Peshtigo

Villages

 Coleman
 Crivitz
 Pound
 Wausaukee

Towns

 Amberg
 Athelstane
 Beaver
 Beecher
 Dunbar
 Goodman
 Grover
 Lake
 Middle Inlet
 Niagara
 Pembine
 Peshtigo
 Porterfield
 Pound
 Silver Cliff
 Stephenson
 Wagner
 Wausaukee

Census-designated places
 Amberg
 Dunbar
 Goodman
 Pembine

Other unincorporated communities

 Athelstane
 Bagley Junction
 Beaver
 Beecher
 Beecher Lake
 Cedarville
 County Line (partial)
 Goll
 Harmony
 Loomis
 Kremlin
 McAllister
 May Corner
 Menekaunee
 Middle Inlet
 Miles
 Packard
 Porterfield
 Rubys Corner
 Sweetheart City
 Walsh
 Wagner
 White Pine Haven
 Wilcox

Politics

See also
 Ansul Islands
 Green Island (Wisconsin)
 National Register of Historic Places listings in Marinette County, Wisconsin
 USS Marinette County (LST-953)

References

External links
 Marinette County government website
 Marinette County map from the Wisconsin Department of Transportation
 Marinette and Menominee Area Chamber of Commerce

 
1879 establishments in Wisconsin
Populated places established in 1879
Marinette micropolitan area